Solidarity is a socialist and Trotskyist political party, present in the French-speaking part of Switzerland, in the cantons of Geneva, Vaud, Neuchâtel and Fribourg. The party is a member of the European Anti-Capitalist Left. It is the furthest left party represented in the National Council.

History
The party was founded in 1992 in Geneva. In the 1995 federal elections it received 0.3% of the vote, failing to win a seat. Its vote share increased to 0.5% in the 1999 elections, and a party member running on a list named "Alliance of the Left (Solidarity–Independents)" won a seat in the National Council. The party retained its seat in the 2003 elections, but lost parliamentary representation following the 2007 elections, in which its vote share fell to 0.4%.

The 2011 elections saw the vote share reduced to 0.3%, and although its vote share increased to 0.5% in the 2015 elections, the party remained seatless. Running with the Swiss Party of Labour in the 2019 elections, the party once again won a seat in the National Council, with the electoral alliance receiving a vote share of 1.0%.

References

External links
 

Political parties established in 1992
1992 establishments in Switzerland
Trotskyist organizations in Europe